Ben Brooks (born 1992 in Gloucestershire) is the author of the novels: Grow Up,  Fences, An Island of Fifty, The Kasahara School of Nihilism, Upward Coast and Sadie, Lolito, Everyone Gets Eaten , and Hurra. Writing for children, he has published the Sunday Times and New York Times bestseller Stories For Boys Who Dare to Be Different, Stories For Boys Who Dare to be Different 2, Stories For Kids Who Dare to be Different, The Impossible Boy, and The Greatest Inventor. His first non-fiction book for adults, Things They Don't Want You To Know, was published by Quercus in September 2020. 

He contributed the story 'Kimchi or a Partial List of Misappropriated Hood Ornaments' to Frank Ocean's Boys Don't Cry, accompanying the release of 2016 album Blonde.

Awards 

 2014 Jerwood Fiction Uncovered Prize for Lolito
 2015 Somerset Maugham Award for Lolito
 2018 British National Book Award as 'Children's Book of the Year' for Stories For Boys Who Dare to Be Different

References

1992 births
English male writers
Living people
People from Gloucestershire